Mendizabal or Mendizábal is a Basque surname meaning 'wide mountain'. It may refer to:

Concepción Mendizábal Mendoza (1893–1985), first female civil engineer in Mexico
Enrique Mendizabal (1918–2017), Olympic Shooter for Peru at the 1948 London Games
Gabriel Mendizabal (1765–1838), general during the Napoleonic Wars
Guillermo Mendizábal (born 1954), retired Mexican footballer and manager
Ignacio Uría Mendizábal (1938–2008), Basque businessman, head of construction company, Altuna y Uría
Itziar Mendizabal (born 1981), ballet dancer
José María Álvarez Mendizábal (1891–1965), Spanish politician and lawyer
Juan Álvarez Mendizábal (1790–1853), Spanish economist and politician
Luis A. Aranberri Mendizabal "Amatiño" (born 1945), Basque media professional
Mamen Mendizábal (born 1976), Spanish television and radio journalist
Mariano Juaristi Mendizábal (1904–2001), Azkoitian Basque pelota player known as Atano III
Rosendo Mendizabal (1868–1913), born in Buenos Aires, Argentina

See also
Ecclesiastical Confiscations of Mendizábal also known as the Desamortizacion Ecclesiastica de Mendizabal encompasses a set of decrees from 1835 to 1837 that resulted in the expropriation, and privatization, of monastic properties in Spain

Basque-language surnames